
Mount Schaffer is a  mountain summit located  southwest of Lake O'Hara in Yoho National Park, in the Bow Range of the Canadian Rockies of British Columbia, Canada. Its nearest higher peak is Mount Biddle,  to the southeast.

History
The mountain was named in 1909 for Mary Schäffer Warren (1861–1939), an American-Canadian naturalist, illustrator, photographer, and writer. Other reports have it being named in 1894 by Samuel E.S. Allen for Dr. Charles Schäffer (1838–1903), who was Mary's husband.

The first ascent of the Mount Schaffer was made in 1909 by M. Goddard and W. Richardson.

The mountain's name was made official in 1924 when approved by the Geographical Names Board of Canada.

Geology
Mount Schaffer is composed of sedimentary rock laid down during the Precambrian to Jurassic periods. Formed in shallow seas, this sedimentary rock was pushed east and over the top of younger rock during the Laramide orogeny.

Climate
Based on the Köppen climate classification, Mount Schaffer is located in a subarctic climate zone with cold, snowy winters, and mild summers. Temperatures can drop below  with wind chill factors below . Precipitation runoff from Mount Schaffer drains into tributaries of the Kicking Horse River which is a tributary of the Columbia River.

See also
Geography of British Columbia

References

Gallery

External links
 Weather forecast: Mount Schaffer
 Parks Canada web site: Yoho National Park
 Climbing Mount Shaffer: Explor8ion.com

Two-thousanders of British Columbia
Canadian Rockies
Mountains of Yoho National Park
Kootenay Land District